Rio Bravo Country Club is an 18-hole private golf course located in the foothills in northeast Bakersfield, California. The course is 7,000 yards on hilly terrain designed by Robert Muir Graves. Since the course is located in the northeast, it is one of a few courses that are naturally hilly. It is a championship course, which hosted the Bakersfield Open, a Nike Tour event, between 1990 and 1991.

The course was originally designed to be a part of the Rio Bravo Resorts. However, the course was purchased in 1991, and became a private country club. The country club’s web site describes Hole 11 as one of the most challenging on the course. It writes, “Par Hole 11 at 616 yards from Blue Tees and you will the hero in your group.”

Scorecard

References

External links
 

Golf clubs and courses in Bakersfield, California
1975 establishments in California